Hawthorne is a former rail station located in Hawthorne in Passaic County, New Jersey. Volunteer Railroaders Association (aka VRA), a non-profit railroad preservation group leases the station from the New York, Susquehanna and Western Railway. The station house is an at-grade single story wooden structure which served as the ticket office until June 30, 1966, and was also used as a freight depot building.

The New Jersey Western Railroad built what is now about ten miles of the current New York, Susquehanna and Western Railway right-of way from Hawthorne to Bloomingdale from 1868 to 1870. It was consolidated into the New Jersey Midland Railway. The original station at this location was built in 1872. In 1894 a fire destroyed the station and the station was rebuilt in a larger form. Since 1872, the present station has been located on the corner of Royal Avenue and County Route 654 (Diamond Bridge Avenue).

In 2010 the VRA undertook a massive fund raising needed to move the station. The move of just 75 feet within the same plot away from the corner was to alleviate the nearly monthly truck strikes to the southeast roof corner. As a part of this move a concrete brick and poured floor foundation was constructed. The move contractor hired made the move of the station onto the new foundation on September 20, 2010. After the move the areas of deteriorated siding were replaced and adding a new coat of paint was begun. Also added was a deck with safety railing, a fence between the station & the railroad and a garden area in the location of the old station footing.

It is proposed that New Jersey Transit will build a new station for the northern terminus of the Passaic-Bergen Rail Line adjacent to the NJ Transit Main Line's Hawthorne station several blocks away from this station. The neighborhood of the original Erie mainline station would benefit from state funding to improve signage, lighting and parking.

See also

 NYSW (passenger 1939–1966) map
 Passaic-Bergen-Hudson Transit map
Operating Passenger Railroad Stations Thematic Resource (New Jersey)

Bibliography

References

External links 
Volunteer Railroaders Association aka VRA
Hawthorne New Jersey NYS&W Railroad Station - official homepage

Railway stations in Passaic County, New Jersey
Hawthorne station
Former railway stations in New Jersey
Railway stations in the United States opened in 1872
Railroad museums in New Jersey
Museums in Passaic County, New Jersey
Hawthorne, New Jersey
1872 establishments in New Jersey
Railway stations closed in 1966
1966 disestablishments in New Jersey